Chaitud Uamtham  is a Thai football manager.

References

External links
 

Living people
Chaitud Uamtham
Year of birth missing (living people)
Chaitud Uamtham